The 1997 Euroleague Women was the inaugural edition of the competition, a refoundation of the FIBA Women's European Champions Cup, FIBA Europe's premier competition for women's basketball clubs. Running from 2 October 1996 to 10 April 1997, the competition was turned from a European Cup for all national champion clubs to a 16-team semi-closed championship, with champions from lower-seeded national leagues playing instead the second tier Ronchetti Cup; in addition to thirteen national champions the French, German and Italian runners-up were also granted a spot. Other than suppressing the two qualifying rounds, the competition system was the same as that of the 1996 European Cup.

Bourges Basket defeated defending champion BTV Wuppertal to become the first French team to win the competition since the European Cup's foundation in 1959. The Final Four, which took place in Larissa, was contested by the same four teams as the previous edition's, with Ružomberok beating Pool Comense for the bronze.

Preliminary round

Group A

Group B

Quarter-finals

Final four
 Larissa, Greece

References

EuroLeague Women seasons